Vrindavan Chandrodaya Mandir is a temple under early stages of construction at Vrindavan, Mathura, India. As planned, it will be the tallest religious monument in the world. At its potential cost of  it is likely to be one of the most expensive temples in world. The temple has been planned by ISKCON Bangalore. (~50,000 sq. m.). The project is set in 62 acres of land and includes 12 acres for parking and a helipad.

History

In 1972, Srila Prabhupada, the founder and Acharya of ISKCON spoke about the principle of Yukta Vairāgya right in front of the Bhajan Kutir (a simple and austere dwelling of an ascetic primarily intended to perform his spiritual activities like chanting Krishna's names, writing and teaching) of Sri Rupa Goswami (see picture) to his dozen or more western disciples who were accompanying him on a visit to Vrindavan, India. He said:

Inspired by this vision and statement of Srila Prabhupada, the devotees of ISKCON Bangalore, who are strictly adhering to prabhupadas instructions conceived the Vrindavan Chandrodaya Mandir project to build a skyscraper temple for Lord Sri Krishna.

The foundation stone laying ceremony of Chandrodaya temple in Mathura district was done on 16 March 2014, on the eve of the auspicious occasion of Holi.

Gallery

Construction
Madhu Pandit Dasa had a meeting with President Pranab Mukherjee where he briefed him about the idea of creating the temple. In March 2014, the Uttar Pradesh Chief minister Akhilesh Yadav inaugurated the project. and on 16 November 2014, the President of India, Pranab Mukherjee laid the foundation stone of the temple. The temple building is under construction. The original architectural design has been changed twice (2019 and 2022).

See also
Temple of the Vedic Planetarium, Mayapur
Viraat Ramayan Mandir

References

External links
  Video about the Temple project - Video
 Official website of Vrindavan Chandrodaya Mandir
 Vrindavan Chandrodaya Mandir - thedivineindia.com
 Vrindavan – spiritual capital of India to get a 700 feet high temple
 Mathura Temple World Tallest Temple
 Krishna Bhumi - Vrindavan Chandrodaya Mandir 

International Society for Krishna Consciousness temples
Radha Krishna temples
Hindu temples in Mathura district
Tourist attractions in Mathura
Vrindavan